Dear is the twenty-fourth studio album by Japanese experimental band Boris. Released on 14 July 2017 through Sargent House record label, it marks the band's 25th anniversary. The music video for the track "Absolutego", which shares its title with the band's 1996 debut, was also released in May 2017.

Dear was originally planned as a farewell album. Nevertheless, its sessions produced three albums' worth of material: ten tracks were cut for the record and the rest were reserved for future releases.

Composition
With Dear, Boris craft "straight-down-the-line" doom / stoner rock and "protracted" drone metal. Their sludge heritage also returns.

Critical reception

Upon its release, Dear received positive reviews from music critics. At Metacritic, which assigns a normalized rating out of 100 to reviews from critics, the album received an average score of 78, which indicates "generally positive reviews", based on 14 reviews. AllMusic critic Thom Jurek wrote: "On Dear, Boris again prove their mettle as rock leviathans." Jurek further described the record as a "proof positive that this trio are far from running on empty." The A.V. Club's A.A. Dowd stated: "Even doom fanatics may yearn for a more consistent track list; one drawback to churning out new records at this frequency is that the output can be uneven, mixing the transcendent with the forgettable." Matthew Ritchie of Exclaim! commented: "If you dig deep enough, it's an album filled with surprises from a band that continue to impress."

Track listing

Daymare 2CD

Sargent House CD

Personnel
Boris
Takeshi – bass, guitar, vocals
Wata – guitar, vocals, effects, echo
Atsuo – drums, vocals

References

2017 albums
Boris (band) albums
Sargent House albums